Daniel Owen Simoneau (born January 9, 1959, in Farmington, Maine) is an American former cross-country skier who competed from 1982 to 1984. At the 1984 Winter Olympics in Sarajevo, he finished eighth in the 4 × 10 km relay and 18th in the 15 km event.

Simoneau's best World Cup career finish was second in a 30 km event in Sweden in 1982.

Cross-country skiing results
All results are sourced from the International Ski Federation (FIS).

Olympic Games

World Championships

World Cup

Season standings

Individual podiums 
 1 podium

References

External links 
 

1959 births
Living people
People from Farmington, Maine
American male cross-country skiers
Cross-country skiers at the 1984 Winter Olympics
Cross-country skiers at the 1988 Winter Olympics
Olympic cross-country skiers of the United States